CandyFlip is a 2019 Indian English/Hindi psychedelic thriller film directed by Shanawaz NK. This directorial debut film is produced by 23 Entertainment.

Plot
Set in present-day Goa, CandyFlip is a story about what happens to a man named Roy, who owns a shack in Palolem, after he takes LSD for the first time.

Cast
 Prashant Prakash as Roy
 Prakash Raj as Joseph
 Kalki Koechlin as Emily
 Gulshan Devaiah as Altaf
 Valeriya Polyanychko as Maya
 Sal Yusuf as Cokeman

Production
Candyflip released in Netflix on 15 February 2019.

References

External links
 CandyFlip at the Internet Movie Database

2010s Hindi-language films
Indian thriller films
2019 thriller films
Hindi-language thriller films